White Rock is a ghost town in Republic County, Kansas, United States.  It is located 6 miles north of Courtland.

History
Several attempts were made to settle the area, but it wasn't until 1866 when Thomas Lovewell settled the town permanently.  White Rock was formally laid out in 1871  and school began to be taught that same year. It was considered a desirable location because of its land qualities.

The town was located on the west side of the Republican River in the White Rock township about 14 miles northwest of Belleville.  It was the first settlement in the county west of the Republican River.  In 1873 there were 3 general stores, a sawmill, a corn mill and a hotel.

In 1878 Republic County voters had the chance to approve $130,000 worth of bonds for the Kansas Pacific railway company to build a railroad line that would have extended from Clifton to the then-thriving towns of Seapo, Belleville and White Rock. County voters defeated the bond issue 1,126 to 850. In White Rock township, only two people voted in favor and 95 against.  The last residents of White Rock related that city leaders believed their town was so prosperous that the railroad would build through their town whether or not they approved the bonds to help fund the connection.

As of 1912, there were no businesses and only about 30 people that resided in the location.

References

Further reading

External links
 Republic County maps: Current, Historic, KDOT

Former populated places in Republic County, Kansas
Former populated places in Kansas